Arkyidae is a family of araneomorph spiders first described by Ludwig Carl Christian Koch in 1872 as a subfamily of Araneidae, and later elevated to a full family in 2017.

Genera and species

This section lists all described species :

Arkys Walckenaer, 1837
 A. alatus Keyserling, 1890 — Australia (Queensland, New South Wales)
 A. alticephala (Urquhart, 1891) — Southern Australia
 A. brevipalpus Karsch, 1878 — New Caledonia
 A. bulburinensis Heimer, 1984 — Australia (Queensland, New South Wales)
 A. cicatricosus (Rainbow, 1920) — Australia (Lord Howe Is.)
 A. cornutus L. Koch, 1872 — New Guinea, Australia (Queensland)
 A. coronatus (Balogh, 1978) — New Guinea
 A. curtulus (Simon, 1903) — Eastern Australia
 A. dilatatus (Balogh, 1978) — Australia (Queensland)
 A. enigma Douglas, 2019 — Australia (Tasmania)
 A. furcatus (Balogh, 1978) — Australia (Queensland)
 A. gracilis Heimer, 1984 — Australia (Queensland)
 A. grandis (Balogh, 1978) — New Caledonia
 A. hickmani Heimer, 1984 — Australia (Tasmania)
 A. kaszabi (Balogh, 1978) — New Guinea
 A. lancearius Walckenaer, 1837 (type) — New Guinea to Australia (New South Wales)
 A. latissimus (Balogh, 1982) — Australia (Queensland)
 A. montanus (Balogh, 1978) — New Guinea
 A. multituberculatus (Balogh, 1982) — Australia (Queensland)
 A. nimdol Chrysanthus, 1971 — New Guinea
 A. occidentalis (Reimoser, 1936) — Indonesia (Buru Is.)
 A. roosdorpi (Chrysanthus, 1971) — New Guinea
 A. semicirculatus (Balogh, 1982) — Australia (Queensland)
 A. sibil (Chrysanthus, 1971) — New Guinea
 A. soosi (Balogh, 1982) — New Guinea
 A. speechleyi (Mascord, 1968) — Australia (New South Wales)
 A. toxopeusi (Reimoser, 1936) — Indonesia (Buru Is.)
 A. transversus (Balogh, 1978) — Australia (New South Wales)
 A. tuberculatus (Balogh, 1978) — Australia (Queensland)
 A. varians (Balogh, 1978) — New Caledonia
 A. vicarius (Balogh, 1978) — New Caledonia
 A. walckenaeri Simon, 1879 — Australia, Tasmania

Demadiana Strand, 1929
 D. carrai Framenau, Scharff & Harvey, 2010 — Australia (New South Wales)
 D. cerula (Simon, 1908) — Australia (Western Australia)
 D. complicata Framenau, Scharff & Harvey, 2010 — Australia (Queensland)
 D. diabolus Framenau, Scharff & Harvey, 2010 — Australia (South Australia, Tasmania)
 D. milledgei Framenau, Scharff & Harvey, 2010 — Australia (New South Wales, Victoria)
 D. simplex (Karsch, 1878) (type) — Southern Australia

References

 
Araneomorphae
Araneomorphae families